Michael Wittwer (born 18 February 1967) is a German former professional footballer, who is currently the manager of fourth-tier club FC Nöttingen.

References

Honours
 DFB-Pokal finalist: 1996.

Living people
1967 births
Association football defenders
German footballers
Karlsruher SC players
Karlsruher SC II players
Bundesliga players
FC Nöttingen players

FC Nöttingen managers
West German footballers
People from Enzkreis
Sportspeople from Karlsruhe (region)
Footballers from Baden-Württemberg